Thomas Gair Ashton, 1st Baron Ashton of Hyde (5 February 1855 – 1 May 1933), was a British industrialist, philanthropist, Liberal politician and peer.

Early life and career
Ashton was born at Fallowfield, Manchester, Lancashire, the son of Thomas Ashton (died 1898) and Elizabeth Gair, daughter of Samuel Stillman Gair of Rhode Island. Ashton was baptised on 5 February 1855. The Ashton family had been prominent in the cotton and cloth manufacturing industry for many years. He was educated at Rugby and University College, Oxford, and later managed the family business.

Political career
Ashton was elected to the House of Commons for Hyde in 1885 but lost his seat the following year. Ashton then became wedded to Eva Margret James in 1866 at All Saints Church. He unsuccessfully contested the same seat again in 1892, but in 1895, he was returned for Luton, seat he held until 1911. That year, he was raised to the peerage as Baron Ashton of Hyde, in the County of Chester. During the First World War, he served as Chairman of the Cotton Exports Committee.

Apart from his political career, Ashton was a Justice of the Peace for Cheshire and Sussex and was invested as an Honorary Fellow of Oxford University in 1923.

Family
Two of Lord Ashton's sisters married Lupton brothers: Sir Charles Lupton to Katharine and Arthur Lupton to Harriet. Lord Ashton's first cousin, Helen Potter (née Leech), was the mother of Beatrix Potter.
Ashton married Eva Margaret James, daughter of John Henry James and his wife, Jane Ramsden Ashworth, in 1886. They had four children: two sons and two daughters:

 Thomas Henry Ashton (8 October 1887 – 20 September 1897)
 Marion Evelyn Ashton (born 1890) married Major Robert Wood.
 Margaret Joan Ashton (born 1893) married Hugh Whistler.
 Thomas Henry Raymond Ashton (2 October 1901 – 21 March 1983) succeeded his father as 2nd Baron Ashton of Hyde.

Death
He died on 1 May 1933, aged 78, in Robertsbridge, Sussex, and was succeeded in the title by his second but eldest-surviving son, Thomas Henry Raymond Ashton. Lady Ashton of Hyde died in 1938.

References

Sources
Legg, L. G. Wickham Legg (editor). The Dictionary of National Biography, 1931-1940. Oxford University Press, 1949.
Kidd, Charles, Williamson, David (editors). Debrett's Peerage and Baronetage (1990 edition). New York: St Martin's Press, 1990,

External links 
 

1855 births
1933 deaths
1
People from Fallowfield
People educated at Rugby School
Alumni of University College, Oxford
Ashton, Thomas
Ashton, Thomas
Ashton, Thomas
Ashton, Thomas
Ashton, Thomas
UK MPs who were granted peerages
Thomas
Barons created by George V